Bandera County (Spanish: "flag") is a county in the U.S. state of Texas. It is located in the Hill Country and its county seat is Bandera.

As of the 2020 census, the population is 20,851. Bandera County is part of the San Antonio-New Braunfels metropolitan statistical area.

The county is officially recognized as the "Cowboy Capital of the World" by the Texas Legislature.

History
In 1856, the Texas Legislature established Bandera County from portions of Bexar and Uvalde Counties, and named the county and its seat for Bandera Pass, which uses the Spanish word for flag.

Native Americans
Although the county's earliest evidence of human habitation dates from 8000 to 4000 BC, the county's earliest known ethnology places Lipan Apache and later Comanche settlements in the area during the 17th century.

19th century
In 1841, John Coffee Hays and a troop of Texas Rangers defeated a large party of Comanche warriors, thereby pacifying the region in what became known as the Battle of Bandera Pass.

In 1853, John James and Charles S. DeMontel survey and plan the town of Bandera, which facilitates settlement by A. M. Milstead, Thomas Odem, P.D. Saner, and their families along the river. The families begin making cypress shingles. James, Montel and Company build a horse-powered sawmill and open a store within a year. In the wake of successive national insurrections crushed by Prussia, Austria and Russia, 16 Polish families arrive in Bandera in 1855 and begin working in James and DeMontel's sawmill. August Klappenbach opens the first store and post office. In 1856, the Texas Legislature establishes Bandera County from portions of Bexar County, and the county is formally organized.

By 1860, the population grows to 399, which included 12 slaves. By 1880, sheep and Angora goats become more profitable than farming.

20th century
In 1920, Cora and Ed Buck launch Bandera's tourist industry by taking boarders at their ranch, and by 1933, Frontier Times Museum opens to the public.

During the last 30 years of the 20th century, with an estimated 80% of its land dedicated to farming and ranching industries, the county government facilitates three major actions to preserve its natural heritage: the Lost Maples State Natural Area opens to the public in 1979, the Hill Country State Natural Area opens to the public in 1984, and the Nature Conservancy purchases  of the Love Creek Ranch from Baxter and Carol Adams to create the Love Creek Preserve in 2000.

Geography
Bandera County is a part of the Greater San Antonio area and is located on the Edwards Plateau.

Major highways

  State Highway 16
  State Highway 46
  State Highway 173
  Park Road 37
  Ranch to Market Road 187
  Ranch to Market Road 337
  Ranch to Market Road 1077
  Farm to Market Road 1283
  Ranch to Market Road 2828
  Farm to Market Road 3240

Adjacent counties
 Kerr County (north)
 Kendall County (northeast)
 Bexar County (southeast)
 Medina County (south)
 Uvalde County (southwest)
 Real County (west)

Demographics

As of the 2010 United States census, there were 20,485 people living in the county. 92.8% were White, 0.8% Native American, 0.5% Black or African American, 0.3% Asian, 3.8% of some other race and 1.8% of two or more races. 16.7% were Hispanic or Latino (of any race). 17.6% were of German, 13.7% English, 10.2% Irish and 10.1% American ancestry.

As of the census of 2000, there were 17,645 people, 7,010 households, and 5,061 families living in the county.  The population density was 22 people per square mile (9/km2).  There were 9,503 housing units at an average density of 12 per square mile (5/km2).  The racial makeup of the county was 94.02% White, 0.33% Black or African American, 0.90% Native American, 0.28% Asian, 0.06% Pacific Islander, 2.55% from other races, and 1.86% from two or more races.  13.51% of the population were Hispanic or Latino of any race.

There were 7,010 households, out of which 29.10% had children under the age of 18 living with them, 60.80% were married couples living together, 7.30% had a female householder with no husband present, and 27.80% were non-families. 23.20% of all households were made up of individuals, and 9.90% had someone living alone who was 65 years of age or older.  The average household size was 2.49 and the average family size was 2.92.

In the county, the population was spread out, with 24.70% under the age of 18, 5.80% from 18 to 24, 25.70% from 25 to 44, 27.60% from 45 to 64, and 16.20% who were 65 years of age or older.  The median age was 41 years. For every 100 females, there were 99.00 males.  For every 100 females age 18 and over, there were 98.30 males.

The median income for a household in the county was $39,013, and the median income for a family was $45,906. Males had a median income of $31,733 versus $24,451 for females. The per capita income for the county was $19,635.  About 7.70% of families and 10.80% of the population were below the poverty line, including 12.20% of those under age 18 and 9.40% of those age 65 or over.

Education
The following school districts serve Bandera County:
 Bandera Independent School District
 Medina Independent School District (partial)
 Northside Independent School District (partial)
 Utopia Independent School District (partial)

All of the county is in the service area of Alamo Community College District.

Communities

City
 Bandera (county seat)

Census-designated places 
 Lake Medina Shores (partly in Medina County)
 Lakehills (largest community)

Unincorporated communities 
 Bandera Falls
 Medina
 Pipe Creek
 Tarpley
 Vanderpool

Ghost town 
 Tuff

Politics

See also

 List of museums in Central Texas
 National Register of Historic Places listings in Bandera County, Texas
 Recorded Texas Historic Landmarks in Bandera County

References

External links
 
 Bandera County Chamber of Commerce
 Bandera County Convention and Visitor Bureau
 
 Bandera County from the Texas Almanac
 Bandera County from the TXGenWeb Project
 Pioneer history of Bandera County: seventy-five years of intrepid history, published 1922, hosted by The Portal to Texas History

 
1856 establishments in Texas
Populated places established in 1856
Greater San Antonio
Texas Hill Country